C.B.I. Shankar is a 1989 Indian Kannada language drama film directed by P. Nanjundappa. It stars Shankar Nag in the titular role as Shankar, an officer with the CBI, who investigates a murder case closed down by the local police. The supporting cast features Devaraj, Doddanna, Vajramuni, Suman Ranganathan and Shashikumar. The film was a blockbuster and further established Nag as a leading actor in Kannada cinema.

Plot
Sub-inspector Galappa Doddamani stumbles at Sathya's filming location in a forest, of the film CBI Shankar. The president of the local Zilla Parishad Narayana Gowda (Vajramuni) reaches the spot with a businessman Amar (Devaraj), and grant the crew permission to continue filming. Following Gowda's inappropriate behavior with Tara (as herself), the film's female lead, at a party hosted by the film producer, she storms out of the party and walks out of the film. Sathya, also the film's director, persists Amar's sister Asha (Suman Ranganathan) to replace her, to which an initially hesitant Asha agrees in her brother, Amar's absence, who had other plans for her.

Amar away from home strikes a business deal with an agency with the help of Radha, who has a crush on him. Filming with CBI Shankar, Asha, while performing a scene in the film, falls unconscious on seeing blood-stained clothes and backs out of the film. Sathya woos her and convinces her to overturn her decision, and is successful. Amar, on returning home, is furious to find Asha acting and confronts Sathya. He gets the police to the filming location to arrest Sathya on grounds of having forced Asha to act in the film. Sathya then reveals his real identity of Shankar, a CBI officer who, with his team have come down to the town to unearth the murder case of Santosh (Shashikumar), having been closed down previously by the local police calling it a suicide.

In a series of flashback sequences as narrated by the potential suspects to Shankar as part of the investigation, it is seen that Santosh was a dancer who was given a ticket by a political party to contest at the local Zilla Parishad elections. Foreseeing his win, the opposition political party led by Gowda plans on giving him cash in return for his withdrawal. Reluctant to withdraw, Gowda asks Bullet Basya (Sudheer) to "deal with Santosh". Basya tails him and involves him in a fistfight, and shockingly finds Amar stabbing Santosh from behind killing him. Cut to the present, Basya reveals to Shankar that it was Amar who killed Santosh for the reason that the latter pursued Amar's sister. The CBI team proceed to arrest a newlywed Amar only to find him stabbed by Radha, his wife, who reveals that she did so, to avenge her ex-husband's murder by Amar, who had murdered him owing to a business-related dispute. An unhurt Amar manages to escape, who is pursued by Shankar and hands him over to the police.

Cast
 Shankar Nag as Sathya / Shankar
 Suman Ranganathan (credited as Suman Ranganath) as Asha
 Shashikumar as Santosh
 Vajramuni as Narayana Gowda
 Devaraj as Amar
 Doddanna as Sub-inspector Galappa Doddamani
 Avinash as Vikram
 Sudheer as Bullet Basya
 Lohithaswa
 Dinesh as Subramanya
 K. V. Manjayya
 Kunigal Nagabhushan as Seenappa
 Tara as herself in a cameo appearance
 Rockline Venkatesh (uncredited)

Soundtrack

Hamsalekha composed the background score for the film and the soundtrack. The soundtrack album consists of five tracks.

References

External links
 

1989 films
1980s Kannada-language films
Indian drama films
Films scored by Hamsalekha
Central Bureau of Investigation in fiction
Indian nonlinear narrative films